Suullar Myraan is a hill in Megino-Kangalassky Ulus, in the Sakha Republic, Russia.  It is a long sand hill located by the Suola River, a right hand tributary of the Lena River. 

The hill stands out in the surrounding flat landscape. Its name means "leaning mountain" in the Yakut language.

History
There were conflicts in the past between Tyokhtyur and Tomtor villages regarding possession of Suullar Myraan.

An almost complete skeleton of a woolly mammoth (Mammuthus primigenius) was found in 2015 at the foot of the hill. Analysis of spore-pollen from rock samples of the site indicated that the climate of the area at the time that the mammoth lived was warmer than in present-day times.

References

External links

Beautiful places of the world - the valley of the river Suola /долина реки Суола 
Landscapes as a reflection of the toponyms of Yakutia
Hills of Russia
Mountains of the Sakha Republic
Tourist attractions in the Sakha Republic